Gunchū is the historic name of Iyo, Ehime, a city in Japan.

Gunchū may also refer to:
Gunchū Line, railway line operated by Iyotetsu in Ehime
Gunchū Station, railway station in Iyo
Gunchū Port Station, railway station in Iyo